Matrix metalloproteinase-17 (MMP-17) also known as membrane-type matrix metalloproteinase 4 (MT-MMP 4) is an enzyme that in humans is encoded by the MMP17 gene.

Function 

Proteins of the matrix metalloproteinase (MMP) family are involved in the breakdown of extracellular matrix in normal physiological processes, such as embryonic development, reproduction, and tissue remodeling, as well as in disease processes, such as arthritis and metastasis. Most MMP's are secreted as inactive proproteins which are activated when cleaved by extracellular proteinases. The protein encoded by this gene is considered a member of the membrane-type MMP (MT-MMP) subfamily. MMP17 and MMP25 are to this day the only known GPI-anchored membrane-type MMPs, opposite to the more common transmembrane MMPs. The protein activates MMP2 by cleavage.

In melanocytic cells MMP17 gene expression may be regulated by MITF.

References

Further reading

External links
 The MEROPS online database for peptidases and their inhibitors: M10.017

Matrix metalloproteinases
EC 3.4.24